The Villarán Bridge, also known as the Canóvanas Bridge, is a historic bridge over the Canóvanas River in Canóvanas, Puerto Rico. Built in 1892 on the highway between Río Piedras and Río Grande, its iron superstructure was imported from Europe and set on masonry abutments. It is the best-preserved example of an Eiffel pony truss bridge in Puerto Rico or the United States. By 1994, the bridge had been replaced by an adjacent span for vehicular use, but it remained open for pedestrian use.

The bridge was added to the U.S. National Register of Historic Places in 1995.

See also
National Register of Historic Places listings in Canóvanas, Puerto Rico

References

External links

Summary sheet from the Puerto Rico State Historic Preservation Office 

, National Register of Historic Places cover documentation

Road bridges on the National Register of Historic Places in Puerto Rico
Canóvanas, Puerto Rico
Bridges completed in 1892